"The Legend of the Gobblewonker" is the second episode of the animated television series Gravity Falls. The episode was directed by John Aoshima and written by Michael Rianda and series creator Alex Hirsch. The episode premiered on Disney Channel on June 29, 2012.

In "The Legend of the Gobblewonker", young twins Dipper (voiced by Jason Ritter) and Mabel Pines (Kristen Schaal) attempt to capture evidence of the "Gobblewonker", an urban legend believed by the town of Gravity Falls to be a myth. They are accompanied by Soos (Hirsch), leaving Dipper and Mabel's great-uncle "Grunkle" Stan (Hirsch) alone on a fishing trip. The episode introduces the character of Old Man McGucket (Hirsch), an eccentric and deranged hillbilly who resides in Gravity Falls.

Plot 
While having breakfast at the Mystery Shack with Mabel, Dipper comes across a monster photo contest with an award of a thousand dollars. Stan interrupts the pair to announce "family fun day", convincing the twins to hang out with him. However, Dipper and Mabel are dismayed when Stan reveals his intention for the family to go fishing. At the lake, Old Man McGucket appears and claims to have seen the "Gravity Falls Gobblewonker", a monster that lives on Scuttlebutt Island within the lake.

Although the town members, including McGucket's son, mistrust McGucket's claims and ridicule him, Dipper is encouraged to obtain a picture of the Gobblewonker so he and Mabel could win the contest and split the prize money. Mabel accepts, desiring to purchase a giant hamster ball. The twins leave Stan and journey towards Scuttlebutt Island, accompanied by Soos.

Dipper brings 17 cameras to ensure they obtain a picture of the Gobblewonker, but the number of cameras dwindles rapidly due to the team's carelessness. Arriving on Scuttlebutt Island, they approach a monstrous silhouette, only to discover a broken ship being chewed by a colony of beavers. However, the actual Gobblewonker then appears, and pursues the group. They manage escape to a cave, losing more of their cameras in the process. Dipper manages to capture pictures of the Gobblewonker, now stuck in the cave, with his last remaining camera. The "Gobblewonker" then malfunctions, revealing it to be a machine operated by McGucket. McGucket explains that he created the machine to attract attention, as he lacks time with his son. Meanwhile, Stan is irritated over the twins ditching him. He attempts unsuccessfully to meet new companions around the lake, but is rejected instead, leaving him frustrated.

The twins feel guilty about leaving Stan alone, and they rejoin him on his fishing trip. They use their last roll of film to record their fishing journey for the rest of the day.

Production and broadcasting 
"The Legend of the Gobblewonker" was written by series creator Alex Hirsch and writer Michael Rianda. It was directed by John Aoshima. The episode premiered on Disney Channel in the United States on June 29, 2012. The episode was watched by 3.14 million viewers on its premiere night.

On the Disney Channel website, the episode's title is shortened to "The Gobblewonker."

This episode introduces Will Forte as Tyler Cutebiker, as well as Gregg Turkington as Toby Determined. The episode guest-stars Conrad Vernon as McGucket's son, Tate McGucket, and Will Friedle as Reginald.

Reception 
Alasdair Wilkins of The A.V. Club reviewed "The Legend of the Gobblewonker" favorably in conjunction with Tourist Trapped, praising Schaal's voice acting and Mabel's character. He compares the development of Stan and Soos in the episode favorably to their portrayals in Tourist Trapped, and noted the inclusion of more "edgy material".

International airdates
 September 12, 2012: Switzerland
 January 8, 2013: Germany
 February 25, 2014: Austria

References

External links 
 

2012 American television episodes
Gravity Falls episodes
Television episodes about families
Television episodes about robots
Works about fishing
Works about old age